The Raven 1000 UL is an American aircraft engine, that was designed and produced by Raven Redrives of El Prado, New Mexico for use in ultralight and homebuilt aircraft.

The company seems to have gone out of business in 2017 and production ended.

Design and development
The engine is a development of the Suzuki G10 automotive engine. It is a three-cylinder in-line four-stroke, liquid-cooled, gasoline engine design, with a custom-designed belt-type reduction drive with reduction ratio of 2.11:1. It employs electronic ignition and produces  at 5700 rpm.

Applications
Early Bird Jenny

Specifications (1000 UL)

See also

References

External links

Raven aircraft engines
1980s aircraft piston engines